Jubbulpuria ("Jubbulpore one") is the name given to a dubious genus of small dinosaur from the Late Cretaceous of India.

The genus was in 1932 named by Friedrich von Huene. The generic name refers to Jabalpur in India, in the vicinity of which the fossils were found. The type species, Jubbulpuria tenuis, was described by Huene and Charles Alfred Matley in 1933. The specific name means "slender" in Latin.

Its fossil specimens were found by Matley in the Lameta Formation, dating from the Maastrichtian. They consist of two syntypes, GSI K27/614 and GSI K20/612, each being a partial distal caudal vertebra. A third distal tail vertebra, GSI K27/599, has been referred to the species.

Jubbulpuria was originally classified by Huene as a coelurid dinosaur similar to but smaller than Coeluroides, another poorly known theropod from the Lameta Formation. Recent researchers have concluded that its position is hard to determine with any certainty beyond a general Theropoda incertae sedis, and that it should be considered a nomen dubium. It may have been a ceratosaur.

See also

 Timeline of ceratosaur research

Notes

References
 Dinodata.de [in German]

Ceratosaurs
Late Cretaceous dinosaurs
Dinosaurs of India and Madagascar
Fossil taxa described in 1933
Taxa named by Friedrich von Huene
Taxa named by Charles Alfred Matley
Nomina dubia